Paul Friedrich Wolfgang Mederow  (30 June 1887 – 17 December 1974) was a German stage and film actor.

Mederow was born in Stralsund, in the Prussian province of Pomerania and died at age 87 in Brissago, Ticino, Switzerland.

Partial filmography

 Der verführte Heilige (1919)
 Panic in the House of Ardon (1920) as Alfons Ardon [Eventuell ist dies der Chemiker]
 Der siebente Tag (1920)
 Die Tophar-Mumie (1920)
 Tyrannei des Todes (1920) as Sanitätsrat Burow
 Fire in the Opera House (1930) as Munk
 1914 (1931) as Edward Grey, 1st Viscount Grey of Fallodon
 M (1931) (uncredited)
 In the Employ of the Secret Service (1931)
 Typhoon (1933) as the president
 Ripening Youth (1933) as Dr. Stahnke, Lehrer
 Des jungen Dessauers große Liebe (1933) as Oberst Hall
 Hermine und die sieben Aufrechten (1935)
 Hundred Days (1935) as Grouchy
 The Bird Seller (1935)
 Artist Love (1935) as Professor Bergland
 Anschlag auf Schweda (1935) as Der Sanatoriumsarzt in Davos
 Trouble Backstairs (1935) as Magistrate Dr. Horn
 Augustus the Strong (1936) as Pöppelmann
 If We All Were Angels (1936) as District Judge
 Talking About Jacqueline (1937) as Musikprofessor
 Gewitterflug zu Claudia (1937) as Maxwell - Notar
 In the Name of the People (1939) as Jurist
 Passion (1940)
 Weißer Flieder (1940) as Dr. Jensen, Arzt
 The Fire Devil (1940) as General Rusca
 Jud Süß (1940) as Judge Ratner
 Counterfeiters (1940) as Tomaselli
 Kora Terry (1940) as a member of the commission of inquiry
 Sein Sohn (1942) as Der Gefängnisdirektor
 Wedding in Barenhof (1942) as the attorney
 The Golden Spider (1943)
 Doctor Praetorius (1950)
 Melody of Fate (1950)
 Man of Straw (1951) as Dr. Heuteuffel
 Father Is Being Stupid (1953) as the commissioner
 Der verzauberte Königssohn (1953)

Bibliography
 Hardt, Usula. From Caligari to California: Erich Pommer's Life in the International Film Wars. Berghahn Books, 1996.

External links

1887 births
1974 deaths
People from Stralsund
People from the Province of Pomerania
German male film actors
German male silent film actors
20th-century German male actors